Desi rap may refer to:

 Pakistani hip hop
 Indian hip hop